Vinícius Soares Eutrópio (born 27 June 1966) is a Brazilian professional football manager and former player who played as a defensive midfielder. He is the current manager of Confiança.

Managerial career
After being seven years in Atlético Paranaense's staff, Eutrópio moved to Fluminense as a part of Carlos Alberto Parreira's team. On 13 November 2008 he left the latter, being appointed manager of Ituano.

Eutrópio returned to Flu in March 2009 as Parreira's assistant, being named manager on 13 July. After leaving the club just months later, he was appointed at the helm of Grêmio Barueri on 16 December.

After finishing third in 2010 Campeonato Paulista, Eutrópio was again appointed Parreira's assistant, now with South Africa. After the year's FIFA World Cup he joined G.D. Estoril Praia, being sacked by the latter on 27 September 2011.

In 2012 Eutrópio returned to Barueri, being relieved from his duties on 4 June. In August he was appointed at Duque de Caxias, leaving the club in November to manage América Mineiro.

On 19 August 2013, after a brief stint at ASA in March, Eutrópio was appointed Figueirense manager. Despite achieving promotion to Série A at the end of the campaign and winning 2014 Campeonato Catarinense, he was dismissed on 30 April 2014.

On 2 June 2014 Eutrópio moved to Al-Ittihad Kalba SC, leaving the club on 20 October. On 11 December he was appointed at Chapecoense.

This was followed by spells at Ponte Preta and Figueirense, leaving the latter in July 2016. He joined Santa Cruz in December 2016.

Eutrópio returned to Chapecoense on 6 July 2017. He resigned in September 2017.

Eutrópio joined Bolívar in January 2018. He left the club in June 2018 after a poor run of results.

Honours

Player
Criciúma
 Campeonato Catarinense: 1989

 Figueirense
 Campeonato Catarinense: 1996
 Copa Santa Catarina: 1996

Manager
 Figueirense
Campeonato Catarinense: 2014

References

External links

1966 births
Living people
Sportspeople from Minas Gerais
Brazilian footballers
Brazilian football managers
Association football midfielders
Campeonato Brasileiro Série A players
Campeonato Brasileiro Série B players
Campeonato Brasileiro Série A managers
Campeonato Brasileiro Série B managers
Clube Náutico Capibaribe players
Figueirense FC players
Sociedade Esportiva e Recreativa Caxias do Sul players
Associação Atlética Internacional (Limeira) players
Grêmio Esportivo Novorizontino players
União São João Esporte Clube players
Criciúma Esporte Clube players
América Futebol Clube (MG) players
Club Athletico Paranaense managers
Ituano FC managers
Fluminense FC managers
Grêmio Barueri Futebol managers
Duque de Caxias Futebol Clube managers
América Futebol Clube (MG) managers
Agremiação Sportiva Arapiraquense managers
Figueirense FC managers
Associação Chapecoense de Futebol managers
Associação Atlética Ponte Preta managers
Santa Cruz Futebol Clube managers
Guarani FC managers
Paysandu Sport Club managers
Londrina Esporte Clube managers
Associação Desportiva Confiança managers
Primeira Liga managers
G.D. Estoril Praia managers
Bolivian Primera División managers
Club Bolívar managers
Brazilian expatriate football managers
Brazilian expatriate sportspeople in Portugal
Brazilian expatriate sportspeople in Bolivia
Expatriate football managers in Portugal
Expatriate football managers in Bolivia
Al-Ittihad Kalba SC managers
Brazilian expatriate sportspeople in the United Arab Emirates
Expatriate football managers in the United Arab Emirates